Leland Harrison (Lee) Hartwell (born October 30, 1939 in Los Angeles, California) is former president and director of the Fred Hutchinson Cancer Research Center in Seattle, Washington. He shared the 2001 Nobel Prize in Physiology or Medicine with Paul Nurse and Tim Hunt, for their discoveries of protein molecules that control the division (duplication) of cells.

Working in yeast, Hartwell identified the fundamental role of checkpoints in cell cycle control, and CDC genes such as CDC28, which controls the start of the cycle—the progression through G1.

Education
Hartwell attended Glendale High School in Glendale, California, and then received his Bachelor of Science from the California Institute of Technology in 1961. In 1964, he received his Doctor of Philosophy in biology from the Massachusetts Institute of Technology. From 1965 to 1968, he worked at the University of California, Irvine as a professor. He moved to the University of Washington in 1968. In a series of experiments from 1970 to 1971, Hartwell discovered the cell division cycle (CDC) genes in baker's yeast (Saccharomyces cerevisiae). These genes regulate the cell cycle and mutations in the genes are involved in some types of cancer.

Awards and honors

In addition to the Nobel Prize, Hartwell has received many awards and honors including the Louisa Gross Horwitz Prize from Columbia University in 1995. He became a member of the National Academy of Sciences in 1987. In 1996, Hartwell joined the faculty of Fred Hutchinson Cancer Research Center and in 1997 became its president and director until he retired in 2010.

In 1998 he received the Albert Lasker Award for Basic Medical Research, and the Massry Prize from the Keck School of Medicine, University of Southern California in 2000.  On July 9, 2003, Washington Governor Gary Locke awarded the Medal of Merit, the state's highest honor, to Hartwell. He is also a recipient of the Komen Brinker Award for Scientific Distinction.

Research
His earliest publications focused on the isolation of temperature sensitive yeast mutants disabled in basic biological processes, including DNA, RNA and protein synthesis. This led to the identification of the CDC (Cell Division Cycle) genes, which function in promoting the progression through cell division, most notably CDC28, which encodes the yeast Cdk kinase.  Other significant discoveries include introduction of the concept of cell cycle "checkpoints", which delay cell division when cellular insults are generated and also the identification and characterization of the mating signal transduction pathway.

Other positions

Hartwell is the Chairman of the Scientific Advisory Board at the Canary Foundation, a non-profit organization dedicated to developing new technologies for the early detection of cancer. He is also a founding co-chair of the Pacific Health Summit, and a member of its Executive Committee. In September 2009, it was announced that Hartwell would join the faculty of Arizona State University as the Virginia G. Piper Chair of Personalized Medicine and co-director of the Biodesign Institute's Center for Sustainable Health with Dr. Michael Birt.  He is also adjunct faculty at Amrita University in India.

Lee Hartwell Award 
 
This award is given to scientists whose research in yeast has made the most impact in the broader areas of biology. Recipients of the award also give a lecture at the biennial Yeast Genetics Meeting.
 2016 – Susan Gasser, Friedrich Miescher Institute for Biomedical Research
 2014 – George Church, Harvard Medical School
 2012 – Stan Fields, University of Washington, Seattle
 2010 – Randy Schekman, University of California, Berkeley
 2008 – Mitsuhiro Yanagida, Kyoto University
 2006 – Kim Nasmyth, Oxford University
 2004 – Susan Lindquist, Whitehead Institute
 2002 – Leland Hartwell, Fred Hutchinson Cancer Research Center

References

External links 
 

1939 births
Living people
American Nobel laureates
Nobel laureates in Physiology or Medicine
Hartwell
Hartwell
University of Washington faculty
Arizona State University faculty
Members of the United States National Academy of Sciences
Recipients of the Albert Lasker Award for Basic Medical Research
Massry Prize recipients
American scientists
Fred Hutchinson Cancer Research Center people